Maksimir is a district of Zagreb in Croatia.

Maksimir may also refer to:
Maksimir Park, a park located in the Maksimir district
 Stadion Maksimir, a football stadium in the same district, home of Dinamo Zagreb
NK Maksimir, a small football club in Zagreb
ŽNK Dinamo-Maksimir, formerly known as ŽNK Maksimir, women's football club